Superman: Peace on Earth is a treasury giant prestige format 64-page graphic novel published by DC Comics in November 1998. The Man of Steel in an oversized one-shot featuring a cardstock cover with a metallic fifth-color ink. As the holiday season approaches, Clark Kent reflects on the poverty suffered by so many throughout the world and decides to use his vast power to feed the starving and impoverished masses. As Superman sets out to accomplish the impossible, he encounters unexpected resistance to his humanitarian efforts.

Plot 
After helping to start the Christmas season in Metropolis, Superman finds a starving young woman that leads him to look up the topic of world hunger. Wanting to help, Superman proposes to the United Nations to help to end world hunger through the gesture of spending a day delivering as much food as he can to settlements that need it anywhere on the planet, an idea met with significant controversy but ultimately given the go-ahead. With tankers filled with food, Superman flies to starving and impoverished locations all over the Earth, and is met with varying levels of gratitude, praise, fear and frenzy. Eventually, Superman arrives in a country whose militarized government warns against his help. In response to his persistence, they fire a chemical-weapon missile at where he is, with civilians below. He attempts to save the people by sending the cloud of poison into space, but the tanker is damaged and the food is poisoned. He stops his mission in the middle, incomplete. The international press reports it. He returns to Metropolis as Clark Kent. He remembers his adoptive father's teachings on farming and the old proverb Give a man a fish and he eats for a day. Teach a man how to fish and he eats for a lifetime. He decides to be an example to others, sharing his knowledge to anyone in need and hopes to inspire the world.

Awards 
 Reuben Awards
 1998 Comic Book Award for Superman: Peace on Earth
 Eisner Awards
 1999 Best Graphic Album: New, Superman: Peace on Earth, by Paul Dini and Alex Ross (DC)
 1999 Best Painter/Multimedia Artist (Interior Art), Alex Ross, Superman: Peace on Earth (DC) 
 Harvey Awards
 1999 Best Cover Artist, Alex Ross, for Kurt Busiek's Astro City (Image/Homage), Superman Forever (DC), Superman: Peace on Earth (DC) 
 Troféu HQ Mix
 2000 12th HQ Mix Award Best Special Edition, São Paulo, Brazil
Compuserve Comics and Animation Forum
1998 Don Thompson Memorial Awards, Favorite Painter or Mixed-Media Artist, Alex Ross (Superman: Peace on Earth, et al.)

Foreign versions 
Due its universal story, social relevant content, fluid narrative and all-age subject, this standalone title was published, and even republished more than one time, in several countries on different versions and languages, being one of the few Superman comics to be printed in Asia, Europe and America.

References

External links
 Sneak Peak of Batman War on Crime and Superman Peace on Earth

Works cited

1998 graphic novels
1998 comics debuts
Comics by Paul Dini
Superman titles
DC Comics graphic novels